Brookeland High School is a public high school in unincorporated Brookeland, Texas, United States and classified as a 2A school by the UIL.  It is part of the Brookeland Independent School District which is located mainly in northeastern Jasper County.  In 2015, the school was rated "Met Standard" by the Texas Education Agency.

Athletics
The Brookeland Wildcats compete in these sports - 

Cross Country, Basketball, Golf, Tennis, Track, Softball & Baseball

State Titles
Boys Basketball - 
2000(1A)

External links
 Brookeland ISD

References

Schools in Jasper County, Texas
Public high schools in Texas